The Soledad Brothers were three prison inmates who allegedly murdered a security guard in 1970. 

Soledad Brothers may also refer to:

Soledad Brothers (band), an American rock band
"Soledad Brothers", a song by Mad Professor on the album Dub Maniacs on the Rampage